Arthur Harris may refer to:

Sir Arthur Harris (High Sheriff of Essex) (1530–1597), High Sheriff of Essex, England
Arthur Harris (MP) (died 1632), Member of Parliament for Maldon and Essex, and High Sheriff of Essex for 1625–26
Sir Arthur Harris, 1st Baronet, of Stowford (1650–1686), English politician
Sir Arthur Harris, 1st Baronet (1892–1984), head of RAF Bomber Command during World War II
Arthur H. Harris, American mammalogist and paleontologist
James Arthur Harris (1880–1930), American botanist and biometrician
Art Harris (1947–2007), American basketball player
Arthur Harris, a character from The Odd Job, a 1978 comedy film starring Graham Chapman of Monty Python
 A. Brooks Harris (born 1935), American physicist
Arthur Harris (polo) (1890–1968), American polo player